The 2022 Men's EuroHockey Junior Championship II was the 12th edition of the Men's EuroHockey Junior Championship II, the second level of the men's European under-21 field hockey championships organised by the European Hockey Federation. It was held in Plzeň, Czech Republic from 24 to 30 July 2022. The tournament was originally scheduled to be held in Rakovník but a venue change was required due construction works at the initial venue.

Qualified teams
Participating nations qualified based on their final ranking from the 2019 competition.

Results

Standings

Matches

See also
 2022 Men's EuroHockey Junior Championship
 2022 Men's EuroHockey Junior Championship III
 2022 Women's EuroHockey Junior Championship II

Notes

References

Men's EuroHockey Junior Championship II
Junior 2
EuroHockey Junior Championship II
International field hockey competitions hosted by the Czech Republic
EuroHockey Junior Championship II
Sport in Plzeň
EuroHockey Championship II